The South African Railways Class 10E1, Series 1 of 1987 is an electric locomotive.

Between 1987 and 1989, the South African Railways placed fifty Class 10E1, Series 1 electric locomotives with a Co-Co wheel arrangement in mainline service as a new standard heavy goods locomotive.

Manufacturer
The 3 kV DC Class 10E1, Series 1 electric locomotive was designed for the South African Railways (SAR) by the General Electric Company (GEC) and built by Union Carriage & Wagon (UCW) in Nigel, Transvaal. GEC supplied the electrical equipment while UCW was responsible for the mechanical components and assembly. 

Contrary to prior UCW practice, GEC works numbers were allocated to the Class 10E1 locomotives. With the exception of the Class 9E, also a UCW-built GEC-designed locomotive, UCW did not allocate builder’s numbers to previous locomotives it built for the SAR, but used the SAR unit numbers for their record keeping.

Characteristics
The Class 10E1 was introduced as a new standard 3 kV DC heavy goods locomotive. The entire fleet of Class 10E1 electric locomotives uses electronic chopper control which is smoother in comparison to the rheostatic resistance control that was used in the Classes 1E to 6E1 range of electric locomotives.

Brakes
The locomotive makes use of either regenerative or rheostatic braking, as the situation demands. Both traction and electric braking power are continuously variable with the electric braking optimised to such an extent that maximum use will be made of the regenerative braking capacity of the  network, with the ability to automatically change over to rheostatic braking whenever the overhead supply system becomes non-receptive.

Bogies
The Class 10E1 was built with sophisticated traction linkages on the bogies. Together with the locomotive's electronic wheel-slip detection system, these traction struts, mounted between the linkages on the bogies and the locomotive body and colloquially referred to as grasshopper legs, ensure the maximum transfer of power to the rails without causing wheel-slip by reducing the adhesion of the leading bogie and increasing that of the trailing bogie by as much as 15% upon starting off.

Orientation
This dual cab locomotive has a roof access ladder on one side only, immediately to the right of the cab access door. The roof access ladder end is marked as the no. 2 end. In visual appearance, the Series 1 and Series 2 locomotives are virtually indistinguishable from each other. Their shape earned them the nickname broodblikke (breadbins) amongst train crews.

Service
Most of the Class 10E1 locomotives were placed in service at Nelspruit and Ermelo in Mpumalanga. In 1998, a number of Spoornet’s electric locomotives and most of their Class  electro-diesel locomotives were sold to Maquarie-GETX (General Electric Financing) and leased back to Spoornet for a ten-year period which was to expire in 2008.

Works numbers
The Class 10E1, Series 1 GEC works numbers are listed in the table.

Liveries
All the Class 10E1, Series 1 locomotives were delivered in the SAR red oxide livery with signal red buffer beams and cowcatchers and a yellow V stripe on the ends, folded over to a horizontal stripe below the side windows. The number plates on the sides were mounted without the traditional three-stripe yellow wings. In the late 1990s many were repainted in the Spoornet blue livery with outline numbers on the long hood sides and with a yellow and blue chevron pattern on the buffer beams and cowcatchers. After 2008 in the Transnet Freight Rail (TFR) era, several were repainted in the TFR red, green and yellow livery.

Illustration

References

External links

Cape gauge railway locomotives
Co-Co locomotives
3090
GEC locomotives
Railway locomotives introduced in 1987
Union Carriage & Wagon locomotives